Hotel Portofino is a British period drama television series, created and written by Matt Baker. It is about a British family in the 1920s who own and operate a hotel for wealthy clients in an Italian resort town. The six-episode first season was released on BritBox in the United Kingdom on 27 January 2022 and began airing on ITV1 from 3 February 2023. It premiered on Sky Italia on 28 February 2022.

The show was renewed for a second season.

Plot
Bella Ainsworth and her family run a hotel for wealthy holidaymakers in the resort town of Portofino on the Italian Riviera. However, as they deal with the problems of running the hotel while subjected to deception and rampant corruption, the nation of Italy is dealing with political turmoil brought on by the rise of the Fascist movement.

Cast

Main

Recurring
 Carolina Gonnelli as Paola
 Petar Benčić as Francesco
 Maya Ramadan as Lottie Mays-Smith
 Henry Tomlinson as Viscount Heddon
 Dominic Tighe as Pelham Wingfield 
 Bethan Cullinane as Lizzie Wingfield

Episodes

Series 1

Series 2

Production
Baker created and wrote the first series in autumn (September, October, November) 2020. Principal photography took place on location in Rijeka, Lovran, and Rovinj, Croatia and minor part was filmed in Portofino, Italy in 2021. A novelisation of the series, written by JP O'Connell, was published in December 2021 ahead of the series launch on BritBox.

The second series began filming in July 2022, which was Croatia's biggest television production of that year. The production employed 135 Croatian crew, including 13 out of 14 heads of departments, and over than 800 extras.

Release
BetaFilm Group is handling international distribution of the series. In June 2021, it was announced the first series of Hotel Portofino had sold to BritBox and ITV, Sky Italia, Foxtel in Australia and the American broadcaster PBS. Sales expanded to DR in Denmark, Sveriges Television, Norway’s NRK, Yle in Finland, Icelandic broadcaster Sýn and NPO in the Netherlands by October.

BritBox released a trailer for the first series on 5 January 2022.

Reception

Radio Times consistently complimented series one, awarding Hotel Portofino a glowing front cover and countless Pick of the Days. Jane Rackham also boasted the 'sumptuous period drama' as 'enjoyable escapism' in the magazine.

Anita Singh in The Telegraph gave the first series two out of five stars, praising the production values but unimpressed by the writing. Singh remarked, 'It is a drama serial which draws so heavily from The Durrells and Downton Abbey that it could have been assembled from an ITV kit, although it is a pale imitation of both. 

Barbara Ellen of The Observer awarded the second series two out of five stars, summarizing it as 'so silly you may just enjoy it.'

References

External links
 

2022 British television series debuts
2020s British drama television series
English-language television shows
Television series set in the 1920s
Television shows adapted into novels
Television shows filmed in Croatia
Television shows filmed in Italy
Television shows set in Italy
BritBox original programming